Isoptericola is a Gram-positive and rod-shaped bacterial genus from the family Promicromonosporaceae.

References

Further reading 
 

Micrococcales
Bacteria genera